Daryl L. Cameron (born July 10, 1957, in Chicago, Illinois), better known as Captain Sky, is an American musician and singer.  Captain Sky’s funk-based musical style, futuristic costumes, and psychedelic imagery are similar to those of George Clinton, Bootsy Collins, and other Parliament/Funkadelic projects. His signature song 'Super Sporm' was notably referenced in the hip hop standard Rapper's Delight by The Sugarhill Gang His album The Adventures of Captain Sky was the first album on vinyl to have expanded grooves for DJ's to identify different parts of the song with, such as the percussion or bass break. The style of production on the album with gaps on the songs made it easier for hip hop artists to sample.

With a group of other Chicago-based musicians, Captain Sky began recording around 1978 and released The Adventures of Captain Sky in that year, followed quickly by Pop Goes The Captain in 1979.  In the liner notes to the first Captain Sky album, Captain Sky’s origins are explained in this way:  “Oh, by the way, if you’re wondering, Daryl Cameron somehow entered the phonebooth of his mind and emerged as Captain Sky.  Tune in again.” Both albums were released by AVI Records.  Several singles were released from these albums, most notably “Wonder Worm” and “Super Sporm.”  By 1980, Captain Sky had moved to TEC records and on that imprint released his third album Concerned Party #1.  After several more singles, The Return of Captain Sky, his final album, was released in 1981 back on AVI records. That particular album was not authorized or endorsed by Captain Sky. Since that time, Captain Sky has released singles sporadically on various labels and older tracks have been included on various compilations.
Captain Sky also signed with Philly World Records, WMOT, and as a concept artist with Sweet Mountain/Sugar Hill Records.

Early life
Cameron grew up in the Washington Heights neighbourhood of Chicago, with his introduction to music from his father giving him a guitar as gift for his 13th birthday. Cameron attended Luther High School South playing in rock and funk groups there, while listening to soul music on WVON radio.

Career
Before going solo, he was in the Bionic Band and South Side Movement. In the mid 70s he was part of a duo, Aura, with Sheryl Sawyer daughter of Chicago mayor Eugene Sawyer.

Afterwards he joined with Curtis Mayfield's business partner Eddie Thomas who helped sign Cameron to AVI Records. During the first album's recording, Cameron's parents paid for the studio time, working at a pace that was with less pressure from the label alongside keyboardist Donald Burnside. On the 1979 sophomore release 'Pop Goes the Captain', Cameron collaborated with engineer Danny Leake. While touring at the time, his costumes were made by Dexter Griffin who also designed Bootsy Collins' outfits. Cameron brought along then teenager Vince Lawrence for pyrotechnics who went to become a notable house music producer. During this time he dealt with cocaine addiction. After his third release in 1980 with 'Concerned Party #1' he moved to back Chicago in 1985.

In 2011 Cameron moved to Houston, becoming a state-certified peer support specialist for substance abuse recovery. In 2018 he moved back to Chicago to work at a south-side hospital.

In 2020, he released his first album in 40 years, The Whole 9.

Sampled by other artists 

Captain Sky’s single “Super Sporm” has been sampled by many artists including:

Discography 

Albums

Singles

References

External links
A promotional bio of Captain Sky circa 1978

1957 births
Living people
American funk bass guitarists
American male bass guitarists
American funk singers
American male singers
Singers from Chicago
Guitarists from Chicago
20th-century American bass guitarists
20th-century American male musicians